Kenneth Bie Kobani is a Nigerian politician of the People's Democratic Party. He is a former Rivers State Commissioner of Finance, and was previously a Commissioner of Commerce and Industry. He was a former National Treasurer of the defunct Action Congress of Nigeria (ACN).He served as a minister in the Cabinet of President Jonathan, serving as the Minister of State for Industry, Trade and Investment. He is a former Secretary to the State Government in Rivers State, a position to which he was appointed in June 2015. and left office in 2019.

Early life
Kobani was born in Port Harcourt, Rivers State, Nigeria. He is the son of Chief Nna Edward Kobani,(Tonsimene Gokana),a politician who was murdered at Giokoo, Gokana on 21 May 1994.

Memberships
 Member, Honourable Society of the Inner Temple and Barrister at Law in the UK. 
Knight of the Catholic Church, of the Order of St. Mulumba.

See also
List of people from Rivers State

References

Rivers State Peoples Democratic Party politicians
People from Gokana
Commissioners of ministries of Rivers State
Federal ministers of Nigeria
Secretaries to the State Government (Rivers State)
Living people
Rivers State Commissioners of Finance
First Wike Executive Council
Year of birth missing (living people)